Spechbach is a commune in the Haut-Rhin department of northeastern France. The municipality was established on 1 January 2016 and consists of the former communes of Spechbach-le-Haut and Spechbach-le-Bas.

See also 
Communes of the Haut-Rhin department

References 

Communes of Haut-Rhin